The second-generation of the BMW 8 Series consists of the BMW G14 (convertible version), BMW G15 (two-door coupe version) grand tourers and BMW G16 (four-door "Gran Coupe" sedan version) executive car  (E). The G14/G15/G16 generation has been in production since 2018, and is often collectively referred to as the G15.

It is the successor to the BMW 6 Series (F06/F12/F13) range and marks the return of the BMW 8 Series nameplate after nearly two decades, which was previously produced as the E31 until its discontinuation in 1999.

The G15 is powered by turbocharged six-cylinder petrol, six-cylinder diesel and V8 petrol engines, mated to an 8-speed automatic transmission. While the initial release of models included all-wheel drive, a rear-wheel drive version of the base 840i and 840d was later made available for sale.

The M8 models (designated F91/F92/F93) were unveiled in 2019 and are powered by the twin-turbocharged BMW S63 V8 petrol engine.

Development and launch 

The BMW 8 Series is based on the BMW Concept 8 Series that debuted at the 2017 Concorso d’Eleganza Villa d’Este, and featured a new design language and iteration of the iDrive system. 

The production version was officially unveiled at the 24 Hours of Le Mans on June 15, 2018. 

The convertible version of the 8 Series (G14) was launched in November 2018. Changes over the coupé include; new cross struts, new panels for the underbody and aluminium roll over bars for added safety. Initial models for the convertible include the M850i xDrive and 840d xDrive. The convertible weighs an additional  more than the coupé. 

Sales of the 8 Series commenced in November 2018.

The high-performance variant BMW Concept M8 Gran Coupé was later introduced in June 2019 at the 2018 Geneva Motor Show.

The Gran Coupé sedan (G16) of the 8 Series was announced in June 2019 and went on sale in September 2019. It has the same powertrains as the coupé and convertible, but it is the first 8 Series available with a six-cylinder engine for the United States. The 8 Series Gran Coupé has enlarged rear passenger space dimensions including improved headroom compared to the 6 Series Gran Coupé (F06) that it replaced. Like its predecessor, the 8 Series Gran Coupé is seen as a flashier sportier alternative to its platform-mate, the more traditional BMW 7 Series (G11) sedan, and it competes with the Mercedes-AMG GT 4-Door Coupé and Porsche Panamera.

Body and chassis 
The production model is based on the modular CLAR platform and has a design largely unchanged from the Concept 8 Series. The wheelbase of the Gran Coupe is  longer than the coupe and convertible models.

The 8 Series utilises a double-wishbone front suspension and rear multi-link suspension. The car uses BMW's Carbon Core technology, integrating carbon-fibre within its chassis. GPS navigation data is used for the 8-speed automatic transmission to predict upshifts or downshifts when approaching a junction, and cameras along with sensors are utilised to determine appropriate shutdowns for the engine start-stop system.

Most trims feature the xDrive all-wheel drive system, although the base 840i and 840d have rear-wheel drive available. The 850i xDrive is available worldwide, while the 840d xDrive is only available in Europe.

Equipment 
Standard equipment includes an 8-speed ZF 8HP torque-converter automatic transmission, Vernasca leather, a heads-up display, adaptive suspension, power steering, and split folding rear seats. The 8 Series also features a  display with iDrive  digital instrument cluster. All 8 series models can be fitted with M Performance Parts. These include a sport steering wheel, M rims and carbon fibre parts. The M850i xDrive receives 20-inch wheels as standard and aerodynamic elements such as larger air intakes and a front lip spoiler.

Available options includes Microsoft Office 365 and Skype for Business integration, laser headlights, a display key fob, and a Bowers & Wilkins Diamond Surround Sound System. Near field communication can also be used to unlock the car via a smartphone. An M Sport package is also available on the 840d xDrive model and features 19-inch alloy wheels, an enhanced braking system, and a re-designed sports steering wheel.

Models

Petrol engines

Diesel engines

Special models

BMW M8 

The M8 version was introduced in June 2019 and is the road-legal version of the M8 GTE introduced at the 2017 Frankfurt Motor Show. The body styles for the M8 are the 2-door convertible (F91 model code), 2-door coupe (F92 model code) and 4-door "Gran Coupe" fastback (F93 model code).

The M8 uses the  BMW S63 twin-turbocharged V8 engine, 8-speed torque converter automatic transmission and all-wheel drive (xDrive) system shared with the F90 M5.

In reference to the M8 Gran Coupé Concept from 2018, the first eight vehicles of the production series of the M8 Gran Coupé were styled in the same colors as the concept vehicle and sold as M8 Gran Coupé First Edition.

Alpina
The ALPINA B8 based on the 8 series Gran Coupe was launched in 2021.

Night Sky Edition 
In January 2019 the one-off version M850i xDrive Coupé Night Sky Edition was unveiled for the 25th anniversary of BMW Individual. The vehicle has a special paint and interior surfaces of the material of the Muonionalusta-meteorite. In addition, a meteor shower is cited. The coupé had its public debut at the 2019 Geneva Motor Show. For the time being, the coupe remains in the possession of BMW.

Production 
The 8 Series is produced at the BMW Group Plant Dingolfing in Germany.
The following are the production figures for the 8 Series:

Gallery

References 

8 Series (G15)
G15
Cars introduced in 2018
2020s cars
Grand tourers
Coupés
Convertibles
Sports sedans
Rear-wheel-drive vehicles
All-wheel-drive vehicles